Greenview is a census-designated place (CDP) in Siskiyou County, California, United States.  Its population is 208 as of the 2020 census, up from 201 from the 2010 census.

Geography
Greenview is located at  (41.549515, -122.920420).

Climate
This region experiences warm (but not hot) and dry summers, with no average monthly temperatures above 71.6 °F.  According to the Köppen Climate Classification system, Greenview has a warm-summer Mediterranean climate, abbreviated "Csb" on climate maps.

Demographics

2010
The 2010 United States Census reported that Greenview had a population of 201. The racial makeup of Greenview was 161 (80.1%) White, 0 (0.0%) African American, 10 (5.0%) Native American, 1 (0.5%) Asian, 0 (0.0%) Pacific Islander, 8 (4.0%) from other races, and 21 (10.4%) from two or more races. Hispanic or Latino of any race were 19 persons (9.5%).

The Census reported that 201 people (100% of the population) lived in households, 0 (0%) lived in non-institutionalized group quarters, and 0 (0%) were institutionalized.

There were 88 households, out of which 18 (20.5%) had children under the age of 18 living in them, 51 (58.0%) were opposite-sex married couples living together, 8 (9.1%) had a female householder with no husband present, 3 (3.4%) had a male householder with no wife present.  There were 4 (4.5%) unmarried opposite-sex partnerships, and 1 (1.1%) same-sex married couples or partnerships. 21 households (23.9%) were made up of individuals, and 9 (10.2%) had someone living alone who was 65 years of age or older. The average household size was 2.28.  There were 62 families (70.5% of all households); the average family size was 2.65.

The population was spread out, with 32 people (15.9%) under the age of 18, 13 people (6.5%) aged 18 to 24, 37 people (18.4%) aged 25 to 44, 80 people (39.8%) aged 45 to 64, and 39 people (19.4%) who were 65 years of age or older.  The median age was 52.6 years. For every 100 females, there were 97.1 males.  For every 100 females age 18 and over, there were 94.3 males.

The homeowner vacancy rate was 1.5%; the rental vacancy rate was 4.0%.  155 people (77.1% of the population) lived in owner-occupied housing units and 46 people (22.9%) lived in rental housing units.

2000
As of the census of 2000, there were 200 people, 88 households, and 60 families residing in the CDP. The racial makeup of the CDP was 89.00% White, 4.00% Native American, 0.50% Asian, and 6.50% from two or more races. Hispanic or Latino of any race were 0.50% of the population.

There were 88 households, out of which 22.7% had children under the age of 18 living with them, 59.1% were married couples living together, 8.0% had a female householder with no husband present, and 31.8% were non-families. 26.1% of all households were made up of individuals, and 11.4% had someone living alone who was 65 years of age or older.  The average household size was 2.27 and the average family size was 2.77.

In the CDP, the population was spread out, with 22.5% under the age of 18, 3.5% from 18 to 24, 21.0% from 25 to 44, 33.5% from 45 to 64, and 19.5% who were 65 years of age or older.  The median age was 46 years. For every 100 females, there were 108.3 males.  For every 100 females age 18 and over, there were 93.8 males.

The median income for a household in the CDP was $36,667, and the median income for a family was $41,591. Males had a median income of $35,625 versus $17,917 for females. The per capita income for the CDP was $19,918.  None of the families and 1.0% of the population were living below the poverty line.

Politics

References

Census-designated places in Siskiyou County, California
Census-designated places in California